Eric Silverwood (25 July 1906 – 1973) was an English footballer who played as an inside forward for Rochdale.

References

Rochdale A.F.C. players
Footballers from Rochdale
1906 births
1973 deaths
English footballers
Association football forwards